Sakar (also ) is a mountain in southeastern Bulgaria, between the rivers Maritsa, Tundzha, Sokolitsa and Sazliyka and close to the borders with Greece and Turkey. The mountain's highest peak is Vishegrad at 856 m.

Sakar is one of the richest regions in Bulgaria in terms of endangered birds of prey populations. Sakar is widely known for the wines produced in the area, but tobacco growing remains a leading occupation. The region's most important administrative centre is the town of Topolovgrad in Haskovo Province.

Honour
Sakar Peak on Livingston Island in the South Shetland Islands, Antarctica is named after Sakar Mountain.

Landforms of Haskovo Province
Mountains of Bulgaria